The 2006–07 Elitserien season was the 32nd season of Elitserien. It began on September 18, 2006, with the regular season ending March 2, 2007. The playoffs of the 84th Swedish Championship concluded on April 14, with Modo Hockey defeating Linköpings HC to win their second championship title.

Regular season

Final standings
GP = Games Played, W = Wins, L = Losses, T = Ties, OTW = Overtime Wins, OTL = Overtime Losses, GF = Goals For, GA = Goals Against, Pts = Points
x - clinched playoff spot, y - clinched regular season league title, e - eliminated from playoff contention, r - play in relegation series

Playoffs
After the regular season, the standard of 8 teams qualified for the playoffs.

Playoff bracket
In the first round, the highest remaining seed chose which of the four lowest remaining seeds to be matched against. In the second round, the highest remaining seed was matched against the lowest remaining seed. In each round the higher-seeded team was awarded home ice advantage. Each best-of-seven series followed a 1–1–1–2–1–1 format: the higher-seeded team played at home for games 2 and 4 (plus 5 and 7 if necessary), and the lower-seeded team was at home for game 1, 3 and 6 (if necessary).

Finals

Elitserien awards

See also
 2006 in sports
 2007 in sports

External links 

Hockeyligan.se — Official site
Swehockey.se — Official statistics

1
Swedish Hockey League seasons
Swe